= Holly Forks, Virginia =

Unincorporated community in Virginia, US

Coordinates: 37°28′06″N 76°47′01″W

Holly Forks is an unincorporated community in New Kent County, Virginia, United States.
